Nelson José Pinto Freire (18 October 19441 November 2021) was a Brazilian classical pianist. Regarded as one of the greatest pianists of his generation, he was noted for his "decorous piano playing" and "interpretive depth". His extensive discography for labels such as Sony Classical, Teldec, Philips, and Decca has garnered awards including the Gramophone Award and Diapason d'Or. Freire appeared as soloist with the world's most prestigious orchestras, including the Berlin Philharmonic, the London Symphony Orchestra, the Royal Concertgebouw Orchestra and the New York Philharmonic. He played and recorded piano duo music with Martha Argerich, a long-time musical and personal friend.

Life 

Freire's recordings garnered awards such as the Gramophone Award, Diapason d'Or, and the Latin Grammy Award (best classical album), in addition to three Grammy Award nominations.

 Edison Award for the CBS recording of Chopin's 24 Préludes
 2002: Soliste de l’Année 2002 (Soloist of the year) at the Victoires de la Musique
 2010: Diapason d’or for Chopin's Nocturnes
 2010: Quarterly Critics Choice of the Preis der deutschen Schallplattenkritik for a live performance with Martha Argerich at the Salzburg Festival
 2011: Quarterly Critics Choice for Liszt's: Harmonies du soir
 2016: Echo Klassik for Bach

Nominations for the Grammy Awards
 2005: Category: Best solo performance, for Chopin's Études, Op. 10, Barcarolle, Op. 60, and Sonata No. 2
 2006: Category: Best solo performance with orchestra, for Brahms: The Piano Concertos
 2010: Category: Best solo performance, for Chopin's Nocturnes

Orders 
 2007: Commander of the Ordre des Arts et des Lettres
 2011: Legion of Honour

See also
 Great Pianists of the 20th Century

References

External links
 Nelson Freire biography at Decca Classics
 Columbia Artists Management Inc agency biography of Nelson Freire
 
 

1944 births
2021 deaths
20th-century Brazilian musicians
20th-century classical pianists
20th-century male musicians
21st-century Brazilian musicians
21st-century classical pianists
21st-century male musicians
Brazilian classical pianists
Decca Records artists
Male classical pianists
Musicians from Minas Gerais
Musicians from Rio de Janeiro (city)
Sony Classical Records artists